The University Hospital of Giessen and Marburg is a German university hospital based in Giessen and Marburg. The Giessen site is the teaching hospital of the University of Giessen whereas the Marburg site is the teaching hospital of the University of Marburg. It is the first privatized university hospital in Germany and, due to the merger of the two sites, one of the largest hospitals in Germany. In total it has 2,285 beds, thereof 1,145 in Giessen and 1,140 in Marburg.

References

 
 
 

Hospitals with year of establishment missing
University of Marburg
University of Giessen
Giessen and Marburg
Medical and health organisations based in Hesse